The Vijaya Stambha is an imposing victory monument located within Chittor Fort in Chittorgarh, Rajasthan, India. The tower was constructed by the Hindu Rajput king Rana Kumbha of Mewar in 1448 to commemorate his victory over the army of Malwa led by Mahmud Khalji in the Battle of Sarangpur. The tower is dedicated to Hindu God Vishnu.

Inscriptions
The inscribed slabs in the uppermost storey containing a detailed genealogy of the rulers of Chittaur and their deeds is ascribed to Rana Kumbha court scholar, Atri and his son Mahesh. The names of the architect, Sutradhar Jaita and his three sons who assisted him, Napa, Puja, and Poma, are carved on the fifth floor of the tower.

The Vijaya Stambha is a remarkable example of religious pluralism practised by the Rajputs. The topmost story features an image of the Jain Goddess, Padmavati.

Commemorative Postal Stamps
Commemorative stamps released by India Post

See also
 Kirti Stambha
 Victory column

References

External links

History of Rajasthan
Towers in India
Monuments and memorials in Rajasthan
Tourist attractions in Chittorgarh district
Victory monuments